Three Stories is a 1997 Russian-Ukrainian comedy film directed by Kira Muratova. It was entered into the 47th Berlin International Film Festival. The picture won the Special Jury Prize at Kinotavr.

Plot
The film consists of three novellas the plot of which is based on criminal stories that do not have usual logical motives. The people who become killers in all these episodes are the ones who at first glance seem to be completely incapable of murder.

The First Story "Boiler Room No. 6"

A modest employee brings a cupboard to the boiler room for his friend, Tikhomirov. He works as a stoker, writes poetry in his spare time and rents out a place for intimate pleasure to local homosexuals.

During a normal conversation between old acquaintances, Tikhomirov time after time returns to the story of his unbearable neighbor who does not let him live in peace and even comes to his workplace in order to compromise him ... Tikhomirov gets interrupted and is not able to get to the point of his request by frequenters of the depraved corner, who by the way also see him as an object for pleasure and even offer money to him...

In the closet lies the naked corpse of Tikhomirov's neighbor (she walked around the house like this), which he intends to burn in the boiler room.

The Second Story "Ophelia"

Ofa works in a hospital archive. She does not like men, women, or children: "I would rate this planet as zero." Her attention is especially directed towards those mothers who abandon their children in a maternity hospital.

A gynecologist makes advances towards Ofa whom she uses for an alibi at the moment she commits the murder of a disowning mother.

Her literary ideal is Shakespeare's Ophelia, whose fate Ofa arranges for a single woman – her own mother, Alexandra Ivanovna Ivanova, who many years ago gave her up.

The Third Story "Girl and Death"

An elderly man in a wheelchair operates a coffee grinder. A little girl who lives nearby plays with him, irritating and annoying the old man from time to time. From the mouth of the baby resonates the neighbor's expectation, that after his death she together with her mother will get his room.

The old man teaches the girl how to play chess, reads a book to her, and she in turn brings a glass of water containing rat poison. After drinking a cup of water, the old man dies.

Cast
 Sergey Makovetskiy as Tikhomirov
 Leonid Kushnir as Gena
 Jean-Daniel as Venia
 Renata Litvinova as Ofa; Ofelia
 Ivan Okhlobystin as Doctor
 Oleg Tabakov as Old Man
 Liliya Murlykina as Girl

References

External links

1997 films
Ukrainian comedy films
1990s Russian-language films
Russian black comedy films
1990s black comedy films
Films directed by Kira Muratova
Russian anthology films
1997 comedy films